Jan Leonhard Camenisch is a Swiss research scientist in cryptography and privacy and is currently the CTO of DFINITY. He previously worked at IBM Research – Zurich, Switzerland and has published over 100 widely cited scientific articles and holds more than 70 U.S. patents.

Camenisch received an engineer's degree in electrical engineering in 1993 and a Ph.D. in computer science in 1998, both from ETH Zurich. He was an assistant professor in computer science at the University of Aarhus, Denmark, before joining the IBM Zurich Research Laboratory in 1999. Camenisch was born in the small Swiss village of Langwies.

Awards 

Camenisch was named Fellow of the Institute of Electrical and Electronics Engineers (IEEE) for contributions to privacy-enhancing cryptographic protocols in 2013 and Fellow of the International Association for Cryptologic Research for contributions to the theory and practice of privacy-preserving protocols and impact on government policy and industry in 2017.

He received the 2010 ACM SIGSAC Outstanding Innovation Award for outstanding theoretical work on privacy-enhancing cryptographic protocols and his leadership in their practical realization and a Technical Achievement Award from the IEEE Computer Society for pioneering theoretical work on privacy-enhancing cryptographic protocols and leadership in their practical realization in 2013.

He was elected as an ACM Fellow in 2018 for "contributions to privacy-enhancing cryptographic protocols and leadership in their practical realization".

References

External links 
 
 
 Jan Camenisch at DBLP

Fellow Members of the IEEE
Fellows of the Association for Computing Machinery
Living people
Year of birth missing (living people)